La statue de la Résistance par Falguière (The statue of the Resistance by Falguière) was a 9-foot tall snow sculpture of a nude woman with a cannon made on 8 December 1870 by Alexandre Falguière during the Siege of Paris in the Franco-Prussian War. Falguière was a member of a National Guard company comprising many artists and intellectuals, among them Felix Philipoteaux. Falguière, assisted by his comrades, erected the statue in a few hours, to symbolize French resistance to Prussia. Philipoteaux's sketch of the sculpture was published later that month. It became a tourist attraction, along with a less celebrated snow bust by Hippolyte Moulin near by. Theodore de Banville wrote an ode and Félix Bracquemond made an etching published by Faustin Betbeder. After the snow sculpture had melted, Falguière's attempts to recreate it in a more permanent medium were unsuccessful, lacking the original's spontaneity. It was Falguière's first female nude, a subject in which he later specialised.

References
 

1870 in art
1870 establishments in France
1870 sculptures
Outdoor sculptures in France
Franco-Prussian War
Buildings and structures made of snow or ice
Snow sculpture
Sculptures of women in France
Nude sculptures in France